Gruzdev is a Russian male surname, its feminine counterpart is Gruzdeva. It may refer to

Andrei Gruzdev (born 1977), Russian ski-orienteering competitor 
Dmitriy Gruzdev (born 1986), Kazakhstani road bicycle racer 
Vladimir Gruzdev (born 1967), Russian politician, businessman and explorer